Niels-Jørgen Hansen (born 22 October 1965) is a Danish professional darts player who competes in Professional Darts Corporation events.

Career
Hansen's first bigger tournament was the German Open in 2007, where he was one of the Final 64. Throughout his career, he has competed in several similar tournaments.

In SDC Denmark in 2012, he made it to the Finale, but lost 3-6 to Dennis Lindskjold.

He will make his PDC European Tour debut in June 2019 at the 2019 Danish Darts Open, where he will face Ryan Harrington in the first round.

References

External links
 Profile at Darts Database

Danish darts players
Living people
1965 births
British Darts Organisation players
21st-century Danish people